Richard Henry Wilde Dillard   (born October 11, 1937) is an American poet, author, critic, and translator.

Born in Roanoke, Virginia, Dillard is best known as a poet. He is also highly regarded as a writer of fiction and critical essays, as well as one of the screenwriters for the cult classic Frankenstein Meets the Space Monster. He received his Bachelor of Arts degree from Roanoke College and went on to receive of a Master of Arts (1959) and the Ph. D. (1965) from the University of Virginia. While at the University of Virginia he was both a Woodrow Wilson and a DuPont Fellow. He is considered something of an institution at Hollins University where he has been teaching creative writing, literature, and film studies since 1964. Dillard has been the editor of the Hollins Critic since 1996. He also served as the vice president of the Film Journal from 1973 to 1980.

He is the winner of numerous awards for his writing including the Academy of American Poets Prize, the O. B. Hardison, Jr. Poetry Prize, and the Hanes Award for Poetry.  In 2007, he was awarded the George Garrett Award for Service to Contemporary Literature by the Association of Writers & Writing Programs. Dillard influenced many contemporary writers including both his ex-wives Annie Dillard and Cathryn Hankla. Others include the likes of Henry S. Taylor, Lee Smith, Lucinda MacKethan, Anne Jones, Rosanne Coggeshall, Wyn Cooper, Jill McCorkle, Madison Smartt Bell, and Julia Johnson.

Bibliography

 1966 The Day I Stopped Dreaming About Barbara Steele
 1971 News of the Nile
 1972 After Borges
 1974 The Book of Changes
 1976 Horror Films
 1981 The Greeting: New & Selected Poems
 1983 The First Man on the Sun
 1988 Understanding George Garrett
 1994 Just Here, Just Now
 1995 Omniphobia
 1995 Plautus's The Little Box
 1999 Aristophanes's The Sexual Congress
 2001 Sallies
 2011 What Is Owed the Dead
 2014 Not Ideas

References

1937 births
Writers from Roanoke, Virginia
American humanities academics
American literary critics
American translators
Hollins University faculty
Latin–English translators
Living people
Roanoke College alumni
University of Virginia alumni
American male poets
Journalists from Virginia
American male non-fiction writers